The Sicherheitspolizei, or security police, was a militarized German police group set up in most states of the Weimar Republic at the end of 1919 and largely financed by the central government. In its anti-riot role it can be seen as roughly analogous to the Bereitschaftspolizei in today's Federal Republic.

In view of the unstable internal political situation in the Weimar Republic, especially in the imperial capital of Berlin, Hauptmann Waldemar Pabst of the Imperial Cavalry Guards Corps considered a barracked and militarily armed and trained police group necessary to control political violence. It was intended to be a more useful tool in the fight against insurrection than the existing police forces taken from the monarchy. After street extensive general strikes and street violence in March 1919, Pabst sent a corresponding concept to the Reichswehr Minister Gustav Noske during the German Revolution of 1918–19. Noske approved the plan and promoted its formation together with Wolfgang Heine. According to Noske's wishes, the police group thus constituted the nucleus of the new Reichswehr. In September 1919, 2,500 local and municipal police officers protested against the construction of the new national police service. In contrast to local police, who usually wore blue uniforms, the Sipo were called the "green police" after their uniform color.

Conversion and reorganization 

In response to protest from the French government in 1920, the national level security police units were dissolved were either sent to perform local policing. France feared a clandestine rearmament and saw the new para-military police force as a threat to its security. The planned airborne component of some security police had to be abandoned and their use of artillery and tanks were prohibited. France demanded the abolition of the green uniform, which they viewed as camouflage clothing. A blue uniform was introduced in most regions. Only Bavaria, Wurttemberg, Mecklenburg, and Bremen retained uniform components of a dark green color. The pants were mostly black or black-blue. Particularly striking was the Saxon version with a fairly light medium blue color. However, it took some years before the uniforming was completed, since the uniforms already purchased had to be used up before new ones could be requisitioned. Steel helmets were generally abolished and were not reissued until around 1930. The terms "Sipo" and "green police" continued in popular usage until the Nazi reorganization and disbandment of local police forces in 1935.

Strength, training, and equipment 

The training of the security police was tailored to a para-militarily force. The standard service period, analogous to the Reichswehr, was 12 years. The transfer to the local police or gendarmerie was by no means guaranteed, although in general a takeover was planned for the administrative service. With the global economic crisis of 1929, this could no longer be realized, as all countries had to save on personnel costs.

Equipment and armament was entirely designed for combat against heavily armed insurgents. Depending on the size of the member state, the security police had a number of so-called special cars, mostly British Daimler DZVR 21s or German Ehrhardt 21s, which were usually equipped with two turrets with one machine gun each. Machine guns, carbines, and grenades were also issued. The entire training, equipment and armament aimed at a civil war-like use both in large cities and in the countryside.

The security police were deployed extensively, combating the KPD's organized strikes and riots, including the Ruhr Uprising in the aftermath of the Kapp-Putsch in April 1920, the Mitteldeutscher Aufstand ("March Action") in March and April 1921, and the Hamburger Aufstand in October 1923, which were initiated in part by the KPD. From 1929 up to the ascension of the Nazi Party to power, the police were almost continuously engaged in operations protecting or dispersing demonstrations and political events.

Evolution after 1933 
The Nazi concept of the role of the police originally called for only a very small force. Like the Communists, the National Socialists saw a kind of praetorian guardianship of the mainstream democratic parties, especially the SPD in Prussia, which continuously constituted the government there from 1919 to 1932. Moreover, on 9 November 1923, the Hitler's putsch was defeated in Munich by the intervention of the Bavarian state police . As early as 1933, the transformation of the remaining local police into the national state police had begun. From August 1934 until the end of 1935 these were dissolved and its members transferred to the Wehrmacht.

Gallery

References

Bibliography 

 Lothar Danner:  Ordnungspolizei Hamburg. Betrachtungen zu ihrer Geschichte 1919-1933 , Hamburg 1958.

 Lankenau, Heinrich:  Denkschrift aus Anlaß des 10-jährigen Bestehens der Oldenburger Ordnungspolizei , Oldenburg 1929.
 Hellmuth Witt:  Ergänzungen Lothar Danner: Ordnungspolizei Hamburg , Hamburg 1985.

Defunct law enforcement agencies of the Weimar Republic
Weimar Republic